Kuzhener is the name of several inhabited localities in Russia:
Kuzhener, Mari El Republic, an urban locality (an urban-type settlement) in Kuzhenersky District of the Mari El Republic; 
Kuzhener, Nizhny Novgorod Oblast, a rural locality (a village) under the administrative jurisdiction of Tonshayevo Work Settlement in Tonshayevsky District of Nizhny Novgorod Oblast;